Aivar Rehe (3 April 1963 Kohtla-Järve – 2019) was an Estonian banker and civil servant.

In 1985, he graduated from Tallinn Polytechnical Institute.

2004–2006, he was the principal head of Tax and Customs Board. 2008–2015, he was the head of Danske Bank's Estonia branch.

In 2017, he was related to Danske Bank money laundering scandal.

In 2007, he was awarded with Order of the White Star, III class.

References

1963 births
Living people
Estonian bankers
Estonian civil servants
Recipients of the Order of the White Star, 3rd Class
Tallinn University of Technology alumni
People from Kohtla-Järve